IDTV may refer to:

 Improved-definition television, transmitters and receivers that exceed performance requirements of the NTSC standard
 Integrated digital television, television set with a built-in digital tuner
 Interactive television, adding data services to traditional television technology
 Investigation Discovery, a TV channel owned by Discovery Communications